Maryamabad (also Romanized as Maryamābād) is a village in Tirjerd Rural District of the Central District of Abarkuh County, Yazd province, Iran. At the 2006 National Census, its population was 1,223 in 325 households. The following census in 2011 counted 1,353 people in 400 households. The latest census in 2016 showed a population of 1,335 people in 412 households; it was the largest village in its rural district.

References 

Abarkuh County

Populated places in Yazd Province

Populated places in Abarkuh County